The Moth is a 1980 Polish drama film written and directed by Tomasz Zygadło. It was entered into the 12th Moscow International Film Festival where Roman Wilhelmi won the award for Best Actor.

Cast
 Roman Wilhelmi as Jan
 Anna Seniuk as Magda
 Iwona Bielska as Justyna
 Nela Obarska as Agata
 Jerzy Trela as Soltys
 Grzegorz Herominski as Tomek
 Marek Probosz as Marcin
 Piotr Fronczewski as Psychiatrist
 Jerzy Stuhr as Elegant Gentleman
 Inez Fichna as Jola
 Jolanta Nowak
 Jan Hencz
 Janusz Skalski as Krzysztof

References

External links
 

1980 films
1980 drama films
1980s Polish-language films
Polish black-and-white films
Polish drama films